Dragan Milivojević (5 November 1938 - 22 October 1993) was a Croatian actor. He appeared in more than sixty films from 1960 to 1992.

Selected filmography

References

External links 

1938 births
1993 deaths
Actors from Podgorica
Croatian male film actors
Burials at Mirogoj Cemetery